Chrysocentris chalcotypa is a moth in the family Glyphipterigidae. It is known from the Democratic Republic of Congo.

References

Glyphipterigidae
Insects of the Democratic Republic of the Congo
Moths of Africa
Endemic fauna of the Democratic Republic of the Congo